Sheikh Brak was an Armenian village near the town of Atlit in Haifa District, Israel. It should not be confused with the Palestinian Arab village of Sheikh Abreik.

History
Sheikh Brak was founded in 1920 when several dozen families of Armenian refugees came to Mandatory Palestine fleeing the Ottoman Empire after the Armenian genocide and leased land from a local Arab Christian landowner. When the landowner fled to Lebanon during the 1948 Palestinian exodus, village lands were distributed to nearby kibbutzim, but the Armenian residents continued living in their formally unrecognized settlement with no connection to the electricity grid and other facilities. Young people were gradually leaving the village to marry outside the community and look for work in bigger cities such as Haifa and Tel Aviv. In 1981, some of the local Armenian families left the village after receiving compensations from the Israel Land Administration. The last family to leave were the Lafajians who did so in 2018, leaving the village uninhabited. Today, only a small Armenian cemetery and several abandoned buildings remain at the site of Sheikh Brak.

See also
Armenians in Haifa

References

Bibliography

Armenian diaspora in Israel
Hof HaCarmel Regional Council
Populated places in Haifa District